Petar Kolev may refer to:

 Petar Kolev (footballer born 1974), Bulgarian retired football defender
 Petar Kolev (footballer born 1984), Bulgarian footballer for Master Burgas